Māngere Bridge may refer to:
Māngere Bridge (suburb), a suburb of Auckland
Māngere Bridge (bridges), Manukau Harbour crossings, New Zealand